Michael Choi may refer to:

 Michael Choi (comics), comic book artist 
 Michael Choi (politician) (born 1959), Australian politician
 Michael Choi (Brookside), a character in Brookside
 Michael Choi (racing driver) (born 1968), Hong Kong racing driver and businessman